George Johnstone Jeffrey was a Scottish minister who served as Moderator of the General Assembly of the Church of Scotland in 1952.

Life

From 1920 to 1928  he was minister of the New Laigh Kirk (West High Kirk) in Kilmarnock.

In 1938 he was minister of Sherbrooke St Gilbert's Church, in Pollokshields in Glasgow. He was still minister of Sherbrooke when he served as Moderator.

He retired from Sherbrooke the year he succeeded William White Anderson as Moderator. He was replaced at Sherbrooke by David Noel Fisher (1914–2009).

Family

He was married with at least one child: Archibald Jeffrey.

References

Moderators of the General Assembly of the Church of Scotland
20th-century Ministers of the Church of Scotland